

Institutes of Eminence (IoE) 
 Indian Institute of Technology Kharagpur

Central Universities

Centrally Funded Technical Institutes
 Ghani Khan Choudhury Institute of Engineering & Technology, Malda
 National Institute of Technical Teachers' Training and Research, Kolkata

Research Institutes

Institute of National Importance

Deemed universities

National Law University

State Universities

Private Universities

Medical & Dental Colleges

Dental colleges
 Burdwan Dental College and Hospital
 Dr. R. Ahmed Dental College and Hospital
 Guru Nanak Institute of Dental Sciences and Research
 Haldia Institute of Dental Sciences and Research
 Kusum Devi Sunderlal Dugar Jain Dental College and Hospital
 North Bengal Dental College and Hospital

AYUSH Institutions

Homeopathic

Ayurvedic
 Raghunath Ayurved Mahavidyalaya and Hospital
 Rajib Gandhi Ayurvedic Medical College & Hospital.
 Institute of Post Graduate Ayurvedic Education & Research.
 J.B. Roy State Ayurvedic Medical College & Hospital.

Unani
 Calcutta Unani Medical College and Hospital

Engineering and Management Colleges

Affiliated colleges

Government General Degree Colleges (GGDC) 

 General General Degree College, Ranibandh
 Kabi Jagadram Roy Govt. General Degree College
 Government General Degree College, Mangalkote
 Government General Degree College, Kalna
 Government General Degree College, Pedong
 Government General Degree College, Gorubathan
 Government General Degree College, Mohanpur
 Government General Degree College, Kharagpur-II
 Government General Degree College, Gopiballavpur-II
 Government General Degree College, Keshiary
 Sahid Matangini Hazra Government College for Women
 Muragachha GOVT College
 Government General Degree College, Kaliganj
 Government General Degree College, Tehatta
 Government General Degree College, Chapra
 Government General Degree College, Manbazar II
 Government General Degree College, Hili
 Government General Degree College, Kushmandi
 Sister Nibedita Government General Degree College for Girls
 Nayagram Pandit Raghunath Murmu Government College
 Government General Degree College, Lalgarh
 Government General Degree College, Salboni
 Jhargram Raj College (Girls' Wing)
 Government General Degree College, Singur
 Dr. A.P.J. Abdul Kalam Govt. College, Newtown
 P. R. Thakur Government College
 Banarhat Kartik Oraon Hindi Government College
 Government Girls General Degree College, Ekbalpur
 Lady Brabourne College – Kolkata
 Acharya Brojendra Nath Seal College
 Acharya Prafulla Chandra Roy Government College
 Barasat Government College
 Bethune College
 Bidhannagar College
 Chandernagore Government College
 Durgapur Government College
 Maulana Azad College
 Darjeeling Government College
 Goenka College of Commerce and Business Administration
 Taki Government College
 Hooghly Mohsin College
 Haldia Government College
 Jhargram Raj College
 Krishnagar Government College
 Government College of Art & Craft
 The Sanskrit College
 Government General Degree College, Narayangarh

General Colleges affiliated with Burdwan University
 Bardhaman Raj College
 Birbhum Mahavidyalaya
 Bolpur College
 Galsi Mahavidyalaya
 Government General Degree College, Mangalkote
 Gushkara Mahavidyalaya
 Hooghly Mohsin College
 Hooghly Women's College
 Kabi Joydeb Mahavidyalaya
 Kalna College
 Katwa College
 Maharajadhiraj Uday Chand Women's College
 Mankar College
 Memari College
 Purni Devi Chaudhuri Girls' College, Bolpur
 Syamsundar College
 Tarakeswar Degree College
 Vivekananda Mahavidyalaya.      * kandra Radha kanta kundu Mahabidyalaya  ‚                     *Purbasthali College‚Purbasthali‚

General Colleges affiliated with University of Calcutta
 Acharya Jagadish Chandra Bose College
 Anandamohan College
 Asutosh College
 Bangabasi College
 Baruipur College
 Basanti Devi College
 Bethune College
 Budge Budge College
 Dhruba Chand Halder College
 Dinabandhu Andrews College
 Fakir Chand College
 Jogamaya Devi College
 Lady Brabourne College
 L.J.D. College, Falta
 Maheshtala College
 Netaji Nagar College
 Netaji Nagar College for Women 
 Netaji Nagar Day College
 Ramakrishna Mission Residential college (Autonomous), Narendrapur
 Ramakrishna Mission Vidyamandira(Autonomous), Belur
 St. Xavier's College, Kolkata
 Scottish Church College
 Serampore College
 Sonarpur Mahavidyalaya
 Vijaygarh Jyotish Ray College
 Bangabasi Morning Collage
 Vivekananda College, Thakurpukur
Vidyasagar College

General Colleges affiliated with University of Kalyani
 Krishnath College
 Asannagar Madan Mohan Tarkalankar College
 Berhampore College
 Berhampore Girls' College
 Bethuadahari College
 Chakdaha College
 Chapra Bangaljhi Mahavidyalaya
 Domkal Girls' College
 Dr. B.R. Ambedkar College
 Dukhulal Nibaran Chandra College
 Dumkal College
 Dwijendralal College
 Santipur College
 G.D.College,Shaikhpara
 Murshidabad Adarsha Mahavidyalaya,Islampur
 Kalyani Mahavidyalaya

General Colleges affiliated with Kazi Nazrul University
 Asansol Girls' College
 Banwarilal Bhalotia College
 Bidhan Chandra College, Asansol
 St. Xavier's College, Asansol
 Kulti College
 Deshbandhu Mahavidyalaya
 Kazi Nazrul Islam Mahavidyalaya
 Triveni Devi Bhalotia College
 Raniganj Girls' College
 Durgapur Government College
 Michael Madhusudan Memorial College
 Durgapur Women's College
 Durgapur College of Commerce and Science
 Khandra College
 Pandaveswar College

General Colleges affiliated with Bankura University
 Bankura Christian College
 Bankura Sammilani College
 Bankura Zilla Saradamani Mahila Mahavidyapith
 Barjora College
 Ramananda College
 Sonamukhi College

General Degree Colleges affiliated with Vidyasagar University
Bajkul Milani Mahavidyalaya
Belda College
Kharagpur College
Mahishadal Girls College
Midnapore College
Panskura Banamali College
Prabhat Kumar College
Tamralipta Mahavidyalaya
Jhargram Raj College
Seva Bharati Mahavidyalaya
Egra sarada Sashi Bhushan
Collage

General Colleges affiliated with West Bengal State University
 Ramakrishna Sarada Mission Vivekananda Vidyabhavan, Dumdum
 Acharya Prafulla Chandra College
 Barasat Government College
 Barrackpore Rastraguru Surendranath College
 Basirhat College
 Bidhannagar College
 Dum Dum Motijheel College
 Gobardanga Hindu College
 P. R. Thakur Government College
 Shree Chaitanya College, Habra
 Banipur Mahila Mahavidyalaya, Habra
 Netaji Satabarshiki Mahabidyalay, Ashoknagar
 Panihati Mahavidyalaya,Sodepur
 Rishi Bankim Chandra College for Women, Naihati
 Rishi Bankim Chandra Evening College, Naihati
 Rishi Bankim Chandra College, Naihati

References 

Higher education